KCNW (1380 AM) is an American radio station licensed to serve the community of Fairway, Kansas. The station broadcasts a religious radio format to the Kansas City metropolitan area with a 2,500-watt daytime and 29-watt nighttime signal. KCNW is owned by Wilkins Communication Network and the broadcast license is held by Kansas City Radio, Inc.

In the 1960s, 1380 AM was home to a Top-40 station, KUDL.  In 1973, the Top-40 format jumped to FM and eventually became a soft adult contemporary station, while 1380 housed an oldies format for two years.  The KCNW letters (Kansas City's News World) were adopted shortly after a news format debuted with programming from the short-lived "News and Information Service" based at NBC Radio.  Although following the lead of other AM stations dumping music for talk (notable KQV in Pittsburgh the same year), the news format didn't last long in Kansas City.

In 1978, KCNW started broadcasting religious programming, yielding the acronym Kansas City's New Way.  Today it is a satellite station owned by Wilkins Communication Network of Spartanburg, South Carolina, which specializes in syndicating programs devised by individual churches and airs national shows such as Sid Roth, Irvin Baxter Jr. and Noah Hutchings.

References

External links
Wilkins Communication Network official website
Brief History of KCNW and KUDL

CNW
CNW
Johnson County, Kansas